Taha Behbahani is a famous Iranian painter, sculptor, set designer, TV and theatre director and a university professor was born in 1947 in Tehran, Iran.

Education
As a child he was taught how to paint by his father and later became a distinguished Student of master Ali Akbar Najmabadi (one of kamal-ol-Molk's students) at the age of thirteen.

He went through his high school education and Kamal-ol-Molk Art school simultaneously and then entered the Dramatic Art faculty and graduated in set design for theater, television and cinema.

Later in Paris and Salzburg he started to study and research in the field of Marionette Theater and its connections to the painting and sculpture of the east.

Career

Paintings
Taha was one of the artists who created a new atmosphere in the painting in 1960's. By presenting his works; he propounded the Metaphysical Surrealistic School in painting.

Sculptures
 I have been all locked, till you reach the sun, Dimensions: 31.5x59x9cm, Bronze
 At the liberty summit, I will touch the ground of your threshold, Dimensions: 9x40x47cm, Bronze
 The lovers never have a shade but the tree of life, Dimensions: 96.5x33x8cm, Bronze
 My eyes would not see but “Hoo”, I could ‘not utter a word but “hagh”, Dimensions: 11.5x65.5x85cm, Bronze
 I will sing all night long, till the night drapes fall, Dimensions: 11x27.5x106cm, Bronze	
 Unlock the lock, so as unlock you, Dimensions: 10x31x33.5 cm, Bronze
 Unlock the lock to attain a hundred springs, Dimensions: 9x20x60cm, Bronze
 Our love survives from the roots up to branches, Dimensions: 8x33x96.5 cm, Bronze
 Indemnity of wisdom is a hundred locks on each chain, Dimensions: 9.5x24x48cm, Bronze
 Let us colorize the love in each chain of the lock this night, Dimensions: 11x11.5x62.5 cm, Bronze
 In my praise I will transform the sting in my mind, into enjoyment, Dimensions: 43x43x15cm, Bronze
 If you are a love enthusiast, just desert “me” and “us”, Dimensions: 82.5x45.5x11cm, Bronze

Medallions
The medallions of Taha are made by Gold and Silver.

Exhibitions
He has participated in 40 different exhibitions as a solo artist or as a member of a group of artists in Iran and abroad.

Solo exhibitions

 February 1969, The Collection Exhibition, Iran Bastan Museum, Tehran, Iran
 November 1969, The Collection Exhibition, Iran Bastan Museum
 December 1970, The Exclusive Exhibition, Khaneye Aftab Gallery, Tehran, Iran
 November 1971, The Contemporary Arts of Iran, Iran Novin Museum, Tehran, Iran
 December 1971, The Exclusive Exhibition in Private Office, Tehran, Ira
 February 1972, The First Exhibition of Contemporary Iranian Painters and sculptors, Sullivan Gallery
 March 1972, The second Exhibition of Contemporary Iranian Painters and sculptors, Sullivan Gallery
 May 1972, The Exhibition of Contemporary Painters and sculptors, Tehran Gallery, Tehran, Iran
 September 1973, The Exhibition of Contemporary Iranian Painters and sculptors, The Visual Arts Center
 November 1973, The Exclusive Exhibition, Tehran Gallery, Tehran, Iran
 January 1974, The Collective Exhibition, Tehran Gallery, Tehran, Iran
 June 1974, The Collective Exhibition, Sayhoon Gallery, Tehran, Iran
 October 1974, The Collective Exhibition in Sayhoon Gallery, Tehran, Iran
 October 1974, The Collective Exhibition in Mirabel
 December 1974, The Collective Exhibition in the First International Exhibition
 May 1980, The Exclusive Exhibition in French Foundations, France
 1983, The Speech Invitation for the Central Twentieth Century About the Islamic arts – Especially The paintings after The Islam
 November 1986, The Collective Exhibition in Negresco Art Gallery, Nice, France
 November 1989, The Exclusive Exhibition in Mehr Gallery, Tehran, Iran
 May 1991, The Exclusive Exhibition in Maillez Gallery, Paris, France
 September 1992, The Exclusive Exhibition in Maillez Gallery, Paris, France
 November 1995, The Exclusive Exhibition in Niavaran Palace Museum, Tehran, Iran
 1997, The Exhibition in Satricon, Poland
 March 1999, The Collective Exhibition "The Dream Of Angle" in the Tehran Museum Of Contemporary Art, Iran
 June 2002, The Third Tehran sculpture Biennial, Cultural Center Of Niavaran, Tehran, Iran
 November 2003, A Spiritual Vision", The Tehran Museum Of Contemporary Art, Iran
 September 2004, The Exclusive Exhibition, Niavaran Artistic Creations Foundation, Tehran, Iran
 December 2004, The 6th Tehran contemporary Painting Biennial, The Tehran Museum Of Contemporary Art, Iran
 July 2005, The Spiritual Art Exhibition, The Tehran Museum Of Contemporary Art, Iran
 December 2005, The Modern Art Movement, The Tehran Museum Of Contemporary Art, Iran
 August 2006, The East of Imagination, The Tehran Museum Of Contemporary Art, Iran
 June 2007, The second Fine art exhibition in support of children with Cancer, Niavaran artistic Creations Foundation, Tehran, Iran
 June 2007, The second Fine art exhibition in support of children with Cancer, the Organizer, Tehran, Iran
 September 2007, The collective exhibition in commemorate of 800th Birthday of Mowlana Rumi in Unesco, Paris, France
 September 2007, The collective exhibition Manifestations of contemporary art in Iran- The Tehran Museum Of Contemporary Art, Iran
 October 2007, The Collective Exhibition, Nar Gallery, Tehran, Iran
 November 2008, Solo Exhibition, Shirin Art Gallery, Tehran, Iran
 April 2009, Magic Of Persia, Dubai, UAE
 May 2010, Solo Sculptures Exhibition, Shirin Art Gallery, Tehran, Iran

Group exhibitions
 April 2001, The Collective Exhibition "The Breeze From The Garden of Persia-The Meridian International center, Washington Dc, USA
 September 2002, The Collective Exhibition in The Queen Library, New York City
 September 2003, The Collective Exhibition in Art center Of Plano Texas, USA
 October 2009, 100 Artworks and 100 Artists, Art Center
 September 2010, 4th Beijing International Art Biennial, Beijing, China

Books and articles

He has published a Book and various Articles.

Book
 "The Birds of Taha", 2006

Articles

Professional membership
He has been a member of the executive board of Iran's National Creative Arts Committee, affiliated with UNESCO and a jury member in a number of international exhibitions.

References

External links
 Taha Behbahani Official Website

1947 births
Living people
Writers from Tehran
Iranian painters
20th-century Iranian sculptors
21st-century Iranian sculptors